
Gmina Chęciny is an urban-rural gmina (administrative district) in Kielce County, Świętokrzyskie Voivodeship, in south-central Poland.

The gmina contains part of the protected area called Chęciny-Kielce Landscape Park.

Villages
Apart from the town of Chęciny, Gmina Chęciny contains the villages and settlements of Bolmin, Gościniec, Jedlnica, Korzecko, Lelusin, Lipowica, Łukowa, Miedzianka, Mosty, Ostrów, Podpolichno, Podzamcze Chęcińskie, Polichno, Przymiarki, Radkowice, Siedlce, Skiby, Starochęciny, Tokarnia, Wojkowiec and Wolica.

Neighbouring gminas
Gmina Chęciny is bordered by the gminas of Małogoszcz, Morawica, Piekoszów, Sitkówka-Nowiny and Sobków.

References
Polish official population figures 2006

Checiny
Kielce County